Ariosoma sokotranum is an eel in the family Congridae (conger/garden eels). It was described by Emma Stanislavovna Karmovskaya. It is a marine, deep water-dwelling eel which is known from Sokotra Island (from which its species epithet is derived), in the western Indian Ocean.

Info
Ariosoma Sokotranum is a bathydemersal marine eel, usually found between 395-420 meters below the waters surface. Ariosoma Sokotranum was discovered in 1991 by Emma Stanislavovna Karmovskaya she described it as a new species of conger eel (congridae). Arisoma Sokotranum can only be found in the western Indian Ocean. The Ariosoma has between 136 - 141 vertebrae has a dark edge along the unpaired fins and light coloured pectoral fins with the branchial chamber in the region of the operculum dark. Ariosoma Sokotranum's dorsal fin originates slightly anterior to base of the pectorals.

References

sokotranum
Taxa named by Emma Stanislavovna Karmovskaya
Fish described in 1991